Edward Klemens Drabiński (6 June 1912 – 28 October 1995) was a Polish football player and manager.

Football pre-war

Drabiński began his career with Legia Warsaw after joining the youth teams in 1927. He made his debut for Legia in 1933, before joining Warszawianka in 1938.

World War II

The outbreak of World War II in 1939 stopped his footballing career, and Drabiński was involved in the September Campaign. Drabiński's unit was captured by the Soviet forces in Kozielsk, and was spared exaction due to not being a Polish Army Officer. He was later involved in a prisoner exchange with the German forces and was sent to an Oflag camp. Drabiński later escaped from the camp and met up with Polish General Stanisław Sosabowski with whom he fought with. Eventually he ended up in the United Kingdom where he later trained as a Cichociemni. During this time he played for Dundee United and Dunfermline Athletic in Scotland. Drabiński was awarded with the Virtuti Militari medal for his service in the war.

Football post-war

After the war, Drabiński moved back to Poland and joined his old club Legia Warsaw. Drabiński is the only player to have played for Legia both before and after World War II. He only made 4 more appearances for Legia, and retired from professional football in 1948, quickly becoming the Legia manager. Drabiński went on to manage other top division sides such as ŁKS Łódź, Polonia Bydgoszcz, Polonia Bytom, and Lechia Gdańsk, before winning his only competition as a manager with Gwardia Warsaw in 1967 winning the II liga to get Gwardia promoted to the top division.

Honours

Polonia Bytom
I Liga runner-up (1): 1961

Gwardia Warsaw
II liga winner (1): 1967

Military awards

Virtuti Militari

References

1912 births
1995 deaths
Recipients of the Virtuti Militari
Polish footballers
Polish football managers
Legia Warsaw players
Dundee United F.C. players
Dunfermline Athletic F.C. players
Legia Warsaw managers
Lechia Gdańsk managers
Lech Poznań managers
Odra Opole managers
Polonia Bytom managers
Raków Częstochowa managers
ŁKS Łódź managers
Association football forwards